Captain Simmon Latutin GC (25 July 1916 – 30 December 1944) was a British Army officer who was posthumously awarded the George Cross, the highest British (and Commonwealth) award for bravery out of combat. He won his award for the gallantry he showed in rescuing two comrades, and attempting to save a boy, from a blazing ammunition store on 29 December 1944 in Mogadishu, Somaliland.

Early life
Latutin was born in Camden Town, London on 25 July 1916, the son of Jewish immigrants, Morris and Frieda Latutin. His father was a Tailor. In the 1939 National Register he is living with his parents in the St Pancras district of London, his occupation is recorded as a Musician.

Army service
He was commissioned into The Somerset Light Infantry in 1942, and was seconded to the Somalia Gendarmerie at the time of his GC action. He died of his burns the next day. He was born on 25 July 1916 in London and had been educated at Regent Street Polytechnic and the Royal Academy of Music, where a memorial to him was unveiled in 2006. Notice of his award appeared in a supplement to the London Gazette of 6 September 1946, dated 10 September 1946. He is buried in the Nairobi War Cemetery. In December 2021 a plaque in his memory was installed on the wall of his Camden home by the Jewish American Society for Historic Preservation.

George Cross citation
Latutin's George Cross citation appeared in the London Gazette on 6 August 1946:

Historical marker was placed at the home Latutin lived in in London by the Jewish American Society for Historic Preservation U.K. Branch.

See also
List of George Cross recipients
The Jewish Historical Society of England, issue 2009, has a detailed article on Simmon Latutin by Martin Sugarman, Archivist of the Association of Jewish Ex-Servicemen and Women of the UK – AJEX – Jewish Military Museum.
Comprehensive Guide to the Victoria and George Cross recipients

Notes

References

Somerset Light Infantry officers
British recipients of the George Cross
1916 births
1944 deaths
Alumni of the Royal Academy of Music
People from Camden Town
British Army personnel killed in World War II
English Jews
Military personnel from London